The J class are a class of diesel locomotives built by Clyde Engineering, Granville, for the Western Australian Government Railways in 1966.

History
The J class entered service between July and October 1966 to provide as shunters for the  Eastern Goldfields Railway from Perth to Kalgoorlie that was being converted to standard gauge. They were a development of the Victorian Railways Y class.

J101 was scrapped in July 1986 with the remaining four sold in 1995 to Great Northern Rail Services and moved to South Dynon Locomotive Depot. They operated freight transfer and infrastructure trains under contract to National Rail. Following the cessation of Great Northern Rail Services in 2004, the 4 units were split up. J102 & J103 were sold to CFCLA and stayed in Melbourne. These 2 units were hired to Southern Shorthaul Railroad for use as terminal shunters and infrastructure workings. J102 & J103 were purchased by SCT Logistics for use as shunters at their various terminals. J104 & J105 were sold to Freightlink, renumbered to FJ104 & FJ105, and moved to the Northern Territory as terminal shunters in Alice Springs and Tennant Creek. They were transferred to Genesee & Wyoming Australia following its acquisition of Freightlink.

References

Bo-Bo locomotives
Clyde Engineering locomotives
Diesel locomotives of Western Australia
Railway locomotives introduced in 1966
Standard gauge locomotives of Australia
Diesel-electric locomotives of Australia